Hapoel Muin Daliyat al-Karmel is a football club based in Daliyat al-Karmel in northern Israel. The club is named for Muin Rashad, a former player who was killed during the Yom Kippur War.

History
In 1989–90 the club finished second in the North Division of Liga Alef, qualifying for the promotion/relegation play-offs, but losing to the South Division's runners-up Ironi Ashdod. The club's most successful period came in the next few years as they were promoted to Liga Artzit, then the second level, with the financial backing of the local council.

In 1993–94 the club finished bottom of Liga Artzit and were relegated back to Liga Alef. During the season the club had five points deducted after being found guilty of bribing opposition players during a game the during the previous season. The club was then relegated in consecutive seasons to Liga Bet and then Liga Gimel.

In 1996–97 the club were promoted back to Liga Bet, where they remained until earning promotion to Liga Alef at the end of the 2009–10 season after finishing second in their division of Liga Bet.

In 2013–14, the club finished 14th in Liga Alef North, and relegated to Liga Bet following a defeat of 5–6 on penalties to Maccabi Sektzia Ma'alot-Tarshiha, after a goalless draw in the promotion/relegation play-offs.

Honours

League

Cup competitions

External links
Hapoel Daliyat al-Karmel Israel Football Association 

Daliyat al-Karmel
Daliyat al-Karmel
Association football clubs established in 1971
1971 establishments in Israel
Arab-Israeli football clubs